Chisocheton patens is a tree in the family Meliaceae. The specific epithet  is from the Latin meaning "spreading", referring to the inflorescence.

Description
The bark is pale greenish to black. The flowers are fragrant.

Distribution and habitat
Chisocheton patens is found in Thailand and Malesia. Its habitat is lowland rain forests from sea-level to  altitude.

References

patens
Trees of Thailand
Trees of Malesia
Plants described in 1825